Joseph Harney (born 1936) is an Irish retired hurler who played as a right corner-back for club side Ballydurn and at inter-county level with the Waterford senior hurling team.

Honours

Ballydurn
Waterford Junior Hurling Championship (1): 1962

Waterford
All-Ireland Senior Hurling Championship (1): 1959
Munster Senior Hurling Championship (2): 1957, 1959

References

1936 births
Living people
Newtown-Ballydurn hurlers
Waterford inter-county hurlers